The Minebea PM-9 Submachine Gun, known officially in the Japan Self-Defense Forces (JSDF) as the  or as the M9, is a Japanese-made machine pistol. Analogous to the Israeli IMI Mini-Uzi, it has the same telescoping bolt as the Mini-Uzi, but differs in its appearance, operation and handling.

The JSDF uses the PM-9 as its official submachine gun, although some of its special-forces units now use other weapons. The 1st Airborne Brigade and the Western Army Infantry Regiment are the only special forces units in the Japan Ground Self-Defense Force (JGSDF) known to be armed with the PM-9 as the brigade's main submachine gun. The PM-9 is reported to be in use in the JGSDF's Special Forces Group. The Japan Air Self-Defense Force (JASDF) uses it when conducting base security.
Although PM-9 nomenclature is widely used among non-Japanese firearms communities, there have been no public records or confirmations of its official use. As such, it is mostly referred to in its full name or its shorthands, and less so in the supposed alphanumeric nomenclature in Japanese texts.

History

The PM-9 is produced by the Nippon Miniature Bearing Company, otherwise known as Minebea. The design is analogous to the Mini-Uzi submachine gun. It was adopted in 1999 for non-frontline forces such as vehicle drivers, artillery personnel, some of its special forces units, and some commissioned officers who were given priority for better equipment.

Though it has been the official submachine gun for more than a decade,  JSDF officials are looking at a possible replacement, as it is planned to phase it out in the near future. One possible replacement is the Heckler & Koch MP5. JSDF troops assigned to guard duty on both Japan Maritime Self-Defense Force (JMSDF) and JASDF garrison bases had their PM-9s replaced with other high-performing submachine guns, and the JGSDF will also eventually replace the PM-9.

Features
The PM-9 differs in appearance from its Israeli counterpart in a few ways. A foregrip is mounted underneath the barrel of the PM-9 to aid fully automatic firing with a flash suppressor in place. It can also be modified to have a foldable stock, a detachable suppressor and a mounted reflex sight, though these modifications are most unlikely to be used in peacekeeping operations abroad, since such activities do not involve Japanese soldiers in combat situations. PM-9s were originally made with wooden pistol and foregrips; plastic is used on those currently in JSDF service.

Adoption
There were some questions as to why the PM-9 was only adopted for JSDF use two decades ago, though the following were said to be reasons:

 Minebea was able to create a quality weapon, as it also made the SIG Sauer P220 (Minebea P-9) under license.
 It was the only design that could be manufactured with Minebea's equipment.
 At the time of selection and adoption, the Uzi was highly regarded as an adequate weapon.

Although these reasons are quite valid, it was said that the reason why the PM-9 was adopted as the JSDF's main submachine gun is because of the high costs that would arise if they were to select the Heckler & Koch MP5 instead.

References

External links

 Official JGSDF Page
 Modern Firearms Page

Japan Self-Defense Forces
9mm Parabellum machine pistols
Post–Cold War weapons of Japan
Submachine guns of Japan
Telescoping bolt submachine guns